Comarostaphylis is a genus of shrubs in the heath family native to the Americas from California in the United States to Panama. These are hairy, glandular shrubs to small trees with shreddy bark, often quite similar to their close relatives, the manzanitas.

Species:

Comarostaphylis arbutoides
Comarostaphylis discolor syn C. arguta
Comarostaphylis diversifolia
Comarostaphylis glaucescens
Comarostaphylis lanata
Comarostaphylis longifolia
Comarostaphylis mucronata
Comarostaphylis polifolia
Comarostaphylis sharpii
Comarostaphylis spinulosa

References

External links 
 Genus Profile
 Jepson Manual Treatment
 USDA Plants Profile

Arbutoideae
Ericaceae genera